Breau may refer to:

People
Edgar Breau, Canadian solo musician, also member of Hamilton-based band Simply Saucer in the 1970s
Herb Breau (born 1944), Canadian businessman and politician
Jean-François Breau (born 1978), Canadian singer-songwriter of Acadian origin
Lenny Breau (1941–1984), American guitarist and music educator. Also his self-titled album 
 George Breau (1940–2017) American artist from Massachusetts.

Places
Bréau, commune in the Seine-et-Marne department in the Île-de-France region in north-central France
Bréau-et-Salagosse, commune in the Gard department in southern France